In mathematics, especially in the field of commutative algebra, a connected ring is a commutative ring A that satisfies one of the following equivalent conditions:
 A possesses no non-trivial (that is, not equal to 1 or 0) idempotent elements;
 the spectrum of A with the Zariski topology is a connected space.

Examples and non-examples
Connectedness defines a fairly general class of commutative rings.  For example, all local rings and all (meet-)irreducible rings are connected. In particular, all integral domains are connected. Non-examples are given by product rings such as Z × Z; here the element (1, 0) is a non-trivial idempotent.

Generalizations
In algebraic geometry, connectedness is generalized to the concept of a connected scheme.

References

Commutative algebra
Ring theory